Asarta ciliciella is a species of snout moth in the genus Asarta. It was described by Staudinger, in 1879, and is known from Turkey.

References

Moths described in 1879
Phycitini
Endemic fauna of Turkey
Moths of Asia